The Imrana rape case is a case of sexual assault of a 28-year-old Indian woman by her father-in-law on 6 June 2005 in Charthawal village in the Muzaffarnagar district Uttar Pradesh, India (located 70 km from Delhi).  The Village elders demanded, she leave her home and Husband because she ended up getting raped by her Father in law and a Fatwa was also given which supported this view.

Rape 
On 6 June 2005, Imrana, 28 years old at the time, and the mother of five children, was raped by her 69-year-old father-in-law Ali Mohammad.

Soon after she was raped, a local panchayat (council of elders) asked her to leave her husband Nur Ilahi and declared their marriage null and void.

Her father-in-law Ali Muhammed raped Imrana Noor Elahi, mother of five children and resident of Charthawal town of Muzaffarnagar district in western state of Uttar Pradesh allegedly on June 4. The Islamic seminary Darul Uloom Deoband has ruled that a woman raped by her father-in-law could not be allowed to live with her husband any longer and issuing a fatwa (decree) that her staying with her husband Noor Elahi has become untenable as per the Islamic law after the rape.

According Sunni Islam there is a difference of opinion among the school of thought's while the Hanafi school is firm that the rape victim's marriage stands automatically annulled because father-son relations are “sacred” while followers of the Shafai school argue that she cannot be punished further.

In India, most of the Sunni population belongs to either of the two schools. The Deoband seminary said that it was an individual view, not the board's 

The All India Muslim Law Board (AIMPLB) was divided on the issue with some members also concurring with the Darul Uloom of Deoband fatwa, while the lone woman member of the board Naseem Iqtedar Ali Khan too approved the edict and said that as per the Qur'an, Imrana's conjugal relationship with her husband stands dissolved, since she had been raped by the latter's blood relative. Had she been raped by anyone other than a blood relative, she could have stayed with her husband, but here, a sacred relationship has been violated, the consequences of which has to be borne by Imrana and her husband Noor Elahi and pointed out that the responsibility of the couple's five children would have to be shouldered by Elahi as long as required. "India is not a Islamic country were a rapist is stoned to death. Here it is the law of the land which prevails in cases of granting relief to a rape victim and punishing the offender" Naseem Khan stated.

Later, the Deoband seminary denied that it has issued such a fatwa saying there was no mention of rape. Nur Ilahi continued to stay with Imrana and said that " [they] neither sought advice nor counsel from Deoband. [They] have not raised the issue before clerics." At one point, Uttar Pradesh chief minister Mulayam Singh Yadav also endorsed the view of the Darul Uloom that she can no longer live with her husband. After Imrana's case was highlighted by the national media, the National Commission for Women directed authorities in Muzaffarnagar to take action. The body's chairperson Girija Vyas asked the Uttar Pradesh government to punish the guilty and sought a report on the incident.

Arrest of father-in-law
Police registered a case under sections 376 (rape) and 506 (criminal intimidation) of the Indian Penal Code against Mohammed Ali and arrested him. Police also filed a case against him on 30 June 2005 with a medical report and recorded Imrana's statement before a magistrate. The court had turned down Mohammed Ali's bail plea on 5 December 2005

In a video recorded by the Muslim Political Council of India, Imrana (veiled) says that once she screamed, Mohammed Ali had run away.  On being asked again, she reiterates that the forceful attempt was not successful.

However, the court took a different view based on evidence presented in the trial. 
In October 2006, Mohammed Ali was condemned to a prison term of ten years for raping Imrana. 
At one point the defense lawyer sought a leniency based on age of the defendant, but this was denied. 
The judge also directed Mohammed Ali to pay compensation of ₹8,000 to Imrana for raping her. On the separate charge of criminal intimidation, Mohammed Ali was sentenced to three years in prison and fined in ₹3,000.

Timeline
Chronology of events in the Imrana rape case:

6 June 2005: Ali Mohammed raped his daughter-in-law Imrana.
13 June 2005: A local  panchayat declared Imrana's marriage to Nur Ilahi void as she "had sex" with her father-in-law and asks her to treat her husband as her son, which means she would have to stop living with him.
13 June 2005: Ali Mohammed is arrested.
16 June 2005: Ali Mohammed is sent to judicial custody.
30 June 2005: The police filed cases against Ali Mohammed along with a medical report. Imrana's statement is recorded before a magistrate.
5 December 2005: The court turned down Ali Mohammed's bail plea.
30 December 2005: The charges are framed against Ali Mohammed.
19 October 2006: The court sentenced Ali Mohammed to 10 years in prison for raping Imrana. He also received a three-year term for a separate charge of criminal intimidation.

See also
Shah Bano case

References

Islam in India
History of Uttar Pradesh (1947–present)
Women's rights in Islam
Fatwas
Rape in India
Sharia in Asia
Muzaffarnagar district
2005 crimes in India
Crime in Uttar Pradesh
Incidents of violence against women
Affinity (law)